Antonio Sementini (1743–1814) was a Neapolitan physician.

Biography 
Antonio was born in Mondragone and began to study medicine at the age of 12 years at the University of Naples, where he became a professor. Among his many publications were Institutiones Medicae (1780-1784); Institutiones Physiologicae in usum regii Neapolitanum archigymnasii (1794); L'arte de curare malattia (1801); La patologia, ossia della malattia in generale, preceduta per un saggio di esame del sistema de Brown'' (1803). One of his pupils was Antonio Savaresi.

References 

Physicians from Naples
1743 births
1814 deaths